AYP may refer to:

Places 
 Albany Park railway station, UK, station code
 Coronel FAP Alfredo Mendívil Duarte Airport, Ayacucho, Peru, IATA code

Language 
 North Mesopotamian Arabic (ISO 639-3 ayp), a variety of Arabic

Music 
 American Youth Philharmonic Orchestra, part of AYPO

Organisations
 Adequate Yearly Progress, per the US No Child Left Behind Act
 Crescent Star Party (Ayyıldız Partisi), a political party in Turkey.
 Alaska–Yukon–Pacific Exposition, a world's fair held in Seattle in 1909
 Asom Yuva Parishad, the youth wing of Asom Gana Parishad